Callidula waterstradti is a moth of the  family Callidulidae. It is found in Borneo, Sumatra and Peninsular Malaysia. It is predominantly a montane species, recorded at heights ranging from 1,200 to 1,930 meters.

The wingspan is 12–14 mm.

References

Callidulidae
Moths described in 1998